The Sun Odyssey 319 is a French sailboat that was designed by the Jeanneau Design Office as a cruiser and first built in 2018.

In 2019, the boat was named Best Cruising Monohull Under 40ft, by Sail Magazine.

The design is a development of the Polish Delphia 31.

Production
The design was built by Jeanneau at their plant in Poland, starting in 2018, but it is now out of production.

Design
The Sun Odyssey 319 is a recreational keelboat, built predominantly of solid polyester fiberglass, with wood trim. It has a fractional sloop rig, with a deck-stepped mast, two sets of swept spreaders and aluminum spars with discontinuous 1X19 stainless steel wire rigging. It has a Seldén mast and Technique Voile sails. The hard-chined hull has a nearly plumb stem, an open reverse transom with a swimming platform, dual internally mounted spade-type rudders controlled by a folding wheel and a fixed fin keel or optional stub wing keel and centerboard. On the centerboard model, the centerboard retracts under the main cabin table. The boat displaces  and carries  of cast iron ballast.

A fold-down transom, a bowsprit and in-mast furling mainsail were factory options. The bowsprit allows flying an asymmetrical spinnaker or a code 0 sail.

The design has sleeping accommodation for six people, with a double "V"-berth in the bow cabin, two straight settee berths in the main cabin and an aft cabin with a double berth on the port side. The galley is located on the port side just forward of the companionway ladder. The galley is "L"-shaped and is equipped with a two-burner stove, an ice box and a double sink. A navigation station is opposite the galley, on the starboard side. The head is located aft on the starboard side, next to the companionway.

Operational history
The boat is supported by an active class club, the Jeanneau Owners Network.

In a 2019 review for Sail Magazine, Charles J. Doane found that some of the smaller sail plans, including then one he tested on the water, were under-powered. He concluded, "For anyone looking for a modern compact cruising sailboat this is a hard vessel to ignore. With its versatile sailplan, deep and shoal-draft options, comfortable spacious cockpit and eminently functional interior, the Sun Odyssey 319 makes for a great starter boat for a young family or a couple. It would also be a great retirement boat for older sailors looking to downsize from something larger."

In a 2019 Cruising World review, Herb McCormick wrote, "the Jeanneau Sun Odyssey 319 had me at hello. Well, more accurately, it won me over soon after we’d hoisted sail last October off Annapolis, Maryland, during our Boat of the Year sea trials in a gusty 15- to 20-knot northerly on Chesapeake Bay. With a couple of reefs in the mainsail and a turn or two on the 85 percent self-tacking furling jib, the 32-footer put on a peppy display of get-up-and-go, easily knocking off a solid 6 knots hard on the wind."

See also
List of sailing boat types

References

External links

Keelboats
2010s sailboat type designs
Sailing yachts
Sailboat type designs by Jeanneau Design Office
Sailboat types built by Jeanneau